The University of Montenegro Faculty of Drama (Montenegrin: Fakultet Dramskih Umjetnosti Univerziteta Crne Gore Факултет Драмских Умјетности Универзитета Црне Горе) is one of the educational institutions of the University of Montenegro. The Faculty is located in Cetinje, in the building of the former Turkish embassy to Montenegro.

History 

The Faculty of Drama in Cetinje started its work in the academic year 1994/95, as a department of the Faculty of Fine Arts. In September 1997 it was established as an independent university unit.

Organization 

Undergraduate and postgraduate specialist studies at the Faculty are provided for the following study groups:
 Acting
 Directing
 Theater direction
 Film and TV direction
 Production
 Dramaturgy

The Faculty of Drama organizes postgraduate master studies for three study groups:
 Acting
 Directing
 Production

Academic staff 

Some of the current members of the academic staff are:
 Nikola Vukčević - Montenegrin film director
 Branislav Mićunović - former Minister of Culture of Montenegro
 Marija Perović - Montenegrin film director
 Boro Stjepanović - Bosnian actor and director

References 

Drama
Drama
Montenegro
1997 establishments in Yugoslavia